Edmonton-Ellerslie is a provincial electoral district in Alberta, Canada. It is mandated to return a single member to the Legislative Assembly.

History
The electoral district was created in 1993 from Edmonton-Mill Woods. The 2010 boundary redistribution saw the riding shrink on its north boundary to Anthony Henday Drive from roughly 34 Avenue, losing some land to Mill Woods and Edmonton-Mill Creek.

Boundary history

Electoral history

The electoral district was created in 1993 from Edmonton-Mill Woods. The first election held that year saw incumbent NDP MLA Gerry Gibeault switch from that district to run in Ellerslie. A wave of support for the Alberta Liberals rolled across Edmonton causing Liberal candidate Debby Carlson to win the riding with over half the popular vote. Gibeault was defeated, finishing a distant second place.

Carlson ran for a second term in 1997. She increased her popular support to take the district easily with almost 57% of the popular vote. The 2001 election would prove to be a very tight race as Carlson would barely hang on to win her third term in office. She defeated Progressive Conservative candidate Sukhi Randhawa by less than 300 votes.

On May 28, 2004 Carlson vacated her seat to run in the 2004 federal election in the Edmonton—Strathcona district. Her replacement elected in the provincial election that year would be Liberal candidate Bharat Agnihotri. He would win by a razor thin plurality of 200 votes, taking just under 34% of the popular vote.

The Progressive Conservatives would win the riding in the 2008 election as candidate Naresh Bhardwaj defeated Agnihotri, taking almost 42% of the popular vote.

Legislature results

1993 general election

1997 general election

2001 general election

2004 general election

2008 general election

2012 general election

2015 general election

2019 general election

Senate nominee results

2004 Senate nominee election district results

Voters had the option of selecting 4 candidates on the ballot.

2012 Senate nominee election district results

Student Vote results

2004 election

On November 19, 2004 a student vote was conducted at participating Alberta schools to parallel the 2004 Alberta general election results. The vote was designed to educate students and simulate the electoral process for persons who had not yet reached the legal majority. The vote was conducted in 80 of the 83 provincial electoral districts with students voting for actual election candidates. Schools with a large student body who reside in another electoral district had the option to vote for candidates outside of the electoral district than where they were physically located.

2012 election

References

External links
Website of the Legislative Assembly of Alberta

Alberta provincial electoral districts
Politics of Edmonton